is a Japanese footballer currently playing as a left-back for Codru Lozova.

Career statistics

Club
.

Notes

References

1999 births
Living people
Japanese footballers
Japanese expatriate footballers
Association football defenders
Sakushin Gakuin University alumni
Moldovan Super Liga players
Tokyo Musashino United FC players
FC Codru Lozova players
Expatriate footballers in Moldova
Japanese expatriate sportspeople in Moldova